Patrick Carman (born February 27, 1966, in Salem, Oregon) is an American writer and a graduate of Willamette University.

Carman's first book, The Dark Hills Divide, was published in 2005 The book, and the subsequent books in the same series (The Land of Elyon), were all New York Times bestsellers,. The Land of Elyon has been translated into over twenty languages. The series was nominated for many state and national awards.

Carman followed the five-book Elyon series with the Atherton trilogy, which was shortlisted for the Texas Bluebonnet. Over two dozen books followed across middle grade and YA, including award-winning bestsellers Skeleton Creek, Floors, Pulse, Dark Eden, and Fizzopolis.

Carman is a public speaker who presents at national events throughout the year including the National Book Festival, the LA Book Festival, and the School Library Journal Summit. He has also spoken to over a million students at 2500+ schools across the country. On March 5, 2011, Patrick Carman gave a TED talk about 21st-Century literacy. He started an annual event in his own hometown, Walla Walla Kids Read, as a blueprint for literacy in rural communities.

Awards

 Texas Bluebonnet Award master list
 2020: Mr. Gedrick and Me
 Parents Choice Award, US
 2015: Floors
 Rhode Island Children's Book Award, Nominee
 2015: Floors
 Official Selection, Story Lab Summer Reading Program, UK
 2015: Floors
 2011 New Mexico Land of Enchantment
 2011: Skeleton Creek
 2008: The Dark Hills Divide
 2008-2009: The Dark Hills Divide
 Children's Book Council nominee
 2010: The Crossbones
 2010: Thirteen Days to Midnight
 YALSA Quick Picks for Reluctant Readers list
 2011: Thirteen Days to Midnight
 Pennsylvania Young Reader's Choice Awards
 2010-2011: Skeleton Creek
 Delaware Diamonds Booklist
 2010-2011: Skeleton Creek
 Oregon Battle of the Books List
 2010-2011: Skeleton Creek
 2008-2009: The Dark Hills Divide
 2008-2009: Atherton: The House of Power
 Truman Award Nominee
 2009-2010: Atherton
 National E.B. White Award Nominee
 2008: Atherton
 National Lamplighter Award
 2008: Beyond the Valley of Thorns
 2007: The Dark Hills Divide
 Wyoming Statewide Soaring Eagle Book Award short list
 2009: Atherton: House of Power
 Florida Sunshine State Young Reader's Award Program short list
 2008-2009: The Land of Elyon
 2008-2009: Elliot's Park

 New Hampshire Isinglass Teen Book Award Short List
 2008: Atherton: The House of Power
 VOYA's 2008 Top Shelf Fiction for Middle School Readers List
 National Literacy Explore New Worlds Booklist (1 of 20 books chosen by the Library of Congress)
 Land of Elyon
 The Texas Bluebonnet Award (shortlist)
 2008: Atherton: The House of Power
 Junior Library Guild Premier Selection
 2008: Atherton: The House of Power
 Kids Wings Award recipient
 2008: Atherton: The House of Power
 Cochecho Readers Award
 2005-2006: The Dark Hills Divide
 Great Stone Face Award nominee
 2006: The Dark Hills Divide
 Indian Paintbrush Award nominee
 2005-2006: The Dark Hills Divide
 Black-Eyed Susan Award nominee
 2006-2007: The Dark Hills Divide
 Waukesha County Kids Choice Award nominee
 2006: The Dark Hills Divide
 2007: Beyond the Valley of Thorns
 The Children's Crown Award nominee
 2006-2007: The Dark Hills Divide
 iParenting Media Award
 2005: The Dark Hills Divide
 Colorado Children's Book Award nominee
 2007: Beyond the Valley of Thorns

Bibliography

Novels
 The Black Circle (2009) - the 5th part of 39 clues series
 Thirteen Days to Midnight (2010)
 Omega Rising (2016) - the 3rd part of Voyagers series
 Mr. Gedrick and Me (2019)

The Land of Elyon Series
The Dark Hills Divide (2005)
Beyond the Valley of Thorns (2005)
The Tenth City (2006)
Into the Mist (Prequel) (2007)
Stargazer (2008)

Atherton Series
House of Power (2007)
Rivers of Fire (2008)
The Dark Planet (2009)

Elliot's Park Series
Saving Mister Nibbles (2008)
Haunted Hike (2008)
The Walnut Cup (2009)

Skeleton Creek Series
Skeleton Creek (2009)
Ghost in the Machine (2009)
The Crossbones (2010)
The Raven (2011)
The Phantom Room (2014)
Skeleton Creek is Real (2014)

Trackers Series
Trackers #1 (2010)
Trackers Book 2: Shantorian (2011)

3:15 Series
 3:15 Season One: Things That Go Bump in the Night (book) (2011)

Dark Eden Series
Dark Eden (2011)
Dark Eden 2: Eve of Destruction (book) (2012)

Floors Series
 Floors Book 1: Floors (2011)
 Floors Book 2: 3 Below (2012)
 Floors Book 3: The Field of Wacky Inventions (2013)

Pulse Series
 Pulse (2014)
 Tremor (2015)
 Quake (2016)

Fizzopolis Series
 Fizzopolis: The Trouble With Fuzzwonker Fizz (2017)
 Fizzopolis: Snoodles (2017)
 Fizzopolis: Floozombies (2018)

Towervale Series
 Towervale (2019)
 Towervale II: The Crystal Mountain (2020)

References

External links 

 

Living people
21st-century American novelists
Willamette University alumni
Novelists from Oregon
1966 births
American male novelists
21st-century American male writers